The France national under-16 football team is the national under-16 football team of France and is controlled by the French Football Federation. The team previously competed in the annual UEFA European Under-16 Football Championship before it was converted into an under-17 competition in 2002. The under-16 team competes in regional tournaments, such as the Tournoi de Val-de-Marne and the Montaigu Tournament and international tournaments, such as the Aegean Cup.

Prior to the UEFA European Under-16 Football Championship being converted into an under-17 event, France never won the competition, but finished as runners-up on two occasions in 1996 and 2001.

Players

Current squad 
The following players have been called up to participate in the April 2022 friendly matches against Portugal and Belgium.

Caps and goals updated as of 14 April 2022, before the match against Belgium.

Competitive record

UEFA European U-16 Football Championship record

*Draws include knockout matches decided by penalty shootout.
**Gold background colour indicates that the tournament was won. Red border colour indicates tournament was held on home soil.

Honours
 UEFA European Under-16 Football Championship
Finalists (2): 1996, 2001

 Val-de-Marne Tournament
Champions (7): 1999, 2000, 2001, 2002, 2004, 2005, 2011

 Montaigu Tournament
Champions (9): 1976, 1977, 1983, 1996, 1997, 1998, 2001, 2005, 2006,

 Aegean Cup
Champions (6): 2001, 2009, 2010, 2011, 2012, 2013

References

External links
 Official site 

Under-16
Youth football in France
European national under-16 association football teams